Monochamus spectabilis is a species of beetle in the family Cerambycidae. It was described by Perroud in 1855, originally under the genus Lophoptera. It has a wide distribution throughout Africa. It contains the varietas Monochamus spectabilis var. immaculipennis.

References

spectabilis
Beetles described in 1855